Martín Aguirregabiria Padilla (born 10 May 1996) is a Spanish professional footballer who plays as a right back for Portuguese club F.C. Famalicão.

Club career

Alavés
Born in Vitoria-Gasteiz, Álava, Aguirregabiria joined Deportivo Alavés's youth setup in 2008, aged 12. He made his senior debut with the reserves in the 2014–15 campaign, in Tercera División.

Aguirregabiria scored his first senior goal on 2 November 2014, in a 3–1 home win against CD Aurrerá de Vitoria. On 29 November 2017 he made his first team debut, starting in a 3–0 home win against Getafe CF for the season's Copa del Rey.

After Carlos Vigaray's knee injury, Aguirregabiria made his La Liga debut on 4 December 2017, starting in a 3–2 away win against Girona FC. Ten days later, he extended his contract until 2021.

On 8 June 2018, Aguirregabiria renewed his contract until 2022, being definitely promoted to the main squad. He scored his first professional goal on 31 October, netting his team's second in a 2–2 home draw against Girona FC, for the season's Copa del Rey.

Famalicão
On 18 July 2022, free agent Aguirregabiria moved abroad for the first time in his career, signing a three-year deal with Primeira Liga side F.C. Famalicão.

Career statistics

Club

Honours

International
Spain U21
UEFA European Under-21 Championship: 2019

References

External links

1996 births
Living people
Footballers from Vitoria-Gasteiz
Spanish footballers
Association football defenders
La Liga players
Tercera División players
Deportivo Alavés B players
Deportivo Alavés players
F.C. Famalicão players
Spain under-21 international footballers
Basque Country international footballers
Spanish expatriate footballers
Spanish expatriate sportspeople in Portugal
Expatriate footballers in Portugal